Eleader Juggins (15 June 1882 – 17 August 1966), sometimes known as Ted Juggins or Eli Juggins, was an English professional footballer who played as a goalkeeper in the Football League for Wolverhampton Wanderers.

Personal life 
Juggins served as a gunner in the Royal Garrison Artillery during the First World War. After his retirement from football, he returned to Coventry City as a ground superintendent.

Career statistics

References

1882 births
1966 deaths
Footballers from Birmingham, West Midlands
English footballers
Association football fullbacks
Willenhall F.C. players
Darlaston Town F.C. players
Wolverhampton Wanderers F.C. players
Coventry City F.C. players
English Football League players
Southern Football League players
British Army personnel of World War I
Royal Garrison Artillery soldiers
People from Bilston
Association football wing halves
Southampton F.C. players
Military personnel from Staffordshire